Illya Vitaliyovych Kornyev (born 1 November 1996) is a Ukrainian professional football midfielder who plays for Uzhhorod.

Career
Kornyev is a product of the FC Metalurh Zaporizhzhia youth team system. His first trainer was Mykola Syenovalov.

He made his debut for Metalurh Zaporizhzhia in the Ukrainian Premier League in a match against FC Oleksandriya on 26 July 2015.

References

External links
 
 

1996 births
Living people
Footballers from Zaporizhzhia
Ukrainian footballers
Association football midfielders
Ukraine under-21 international footballers
FC Metalurh Zaporizhzhia players
FC Metalist Kharkiv players
FC Olimpik Donetsk players
Aiolikos F.C. players
NK GOŠK Gabela players
FC Peremoha Dnipro players
FC Uzhhorod players
Ukrainian Premier League players
Ukrainian First League players
Ukrainian Second League players
Ukrainian expatriate footballers
Expatriate footballers in Greece
Ukrainian expatriate sportspeople in Greece
Expatriate footballers in Bosnia and Herzegovina
Ukrainian expatriate sportspeople in Bosnia and Herzegovina